Coulommiers is a commune in the Seine-et-Marne department in the Île-de-France in north-central France.

It is also the name of a cheese of the Brie family produced around that city. Coulommiers station has rail connections to Tournan-en-Brie and Paris.

The town has a statue to Commandant Nicolas-Joseph Beaurepaire who, in 1792, killed himself rather than surrender Verdun to the Prussians.

Demographics
Inhabitants of Coulommiers are called Columériens.

Twin towns
Coulommiers was twinned with Leighton Buzzard in 1958 and with Titisee-Neustadt in 1971.  The twinning was renewed in 1982.

History
Coulommiers was selected to be the first town in France to go fully digital for its terrestrial television, with analog switch-off in January 2009.

Notable people
André the Giant, professional wrestler and actor

See also
Communes of the Seine-et-Marne department

References

External links

Official website of Coulommiers
1999 Land Use, from IAURIF (Institute for Urban Planning and Development of the Paris-Île-de-France région) 
 

Communes of Seine-et-Marne
Champagne (province)